Amyema nestor is a species of epiphytic hemiparasitic plant in the family Loranthaceae. It is native to Western Australia, and found growing only on acacias.

The species was first described in 1897 as Loranthus nestor by Spencer Le Marchant Moore, but was transferred to the genus, Amyema, in 1929 by Benedictus Hubertus Danser.

References

nestor
Eudicots of Western Australia
Plants described in 1897
Taxa named by Spencer Le Marchant Moore